Eight Street station or 8th Street station may refer to:
8th Street station (San Diego), a San Diego Trolley station
Eighth Street station (Miami), a Miami Metromover station
8th Street station (New Jersey), a Hudson–Bergen Light Rail station in Bayonne, New Jersey
Eighth Street station (IRT Second Avenue Line), a demolished elevated train station in New York City
Eighth Street station (IRT Sixth Avenue Line), a demolished elevated train station in New York City
8th Street station (Philadelphia), a subway station in Philadelphia
8th Street station (DC Streetcar), a light rail stop in Washington, D.C.

See also
Eighth Street (disambiguation)
Eighth Street–New York University station, a New York City Subway station
8 Street Southwest station, a C-Train station in Calgary
West Eighth Street–New York Aquarium station, a New York City Subway station